The women's 10 kilometre cross-country skiing event was part of the cross-country skiing programme at the 1952 Winter Olympics. It was the first appearance of a women's cross-country skiing event at the Olympics. The competition was held on Saturday, 23 February 1952. Twenty cross-country skiers from eight nations competed.

Medalists

Results

References

External links
Official Olympic Report
 

Women's cross-country skiing at the 1952 Winter Olympics
Women's 10 kilometre cross-country skiing at the Winter Olympics
Oly